Kastriot Rexha (born 27 September 1988) is a Kosovan professional footballer who plays as a centre-forward for Kosovan club Drita.

External links

Kastriot Rexha at the Albanian Football Association

1988 births
Living people
Sportspeople from Pristina
Kosovan footballers
Kosovan expatriate footballers
Expatriate footballers in Albania
Kosovan expatriate sportspeople in Albania
Association football forwards
Football Superleague of Kosovo players
KF KEK players
KF Hysi players
KF Trepça'89 players
FC Prishtina players
KF Besa players
FC Drita players
KF Feronikeli players
Kategoria Superiore players
KF Vllaznia Shkodër players